Annual record of Texas State Bobcats football team.

Yearly records

References

Texas State

Texas State Bobcats football seasons